The 1952-53 NBA season was the Olympians' 4th and final season in the NBA.  Leo Barnhorst and Joe Graboski led the team in scoring; while Graborski dominated on the boards.

Draft picks

Regular season

Season standings

Record vs. opponents

Game log

Playoffs

West Division Semifinals 
(1) Minneapolis Lakers vs. (4) Indianapolis Olympians: Lakers win series 2-0
Game 1 @ Minneapolis: Minneapolis 85, Indianapolis 69
Game 2 @ Indianapolis: Minneapolis 81, Indianapolis 79

Last Playoff Meeting: 1952 Western Division Semifinals (Minneapolis won 2–0)

Player statistics

References

Indianapolis Olympians seasons
Indianapolis